Silvio Vella (born 8 February 1967) is a former professional footballer who played for Rabat Ajax and Hibernians as a defender. Born in Canada, he represented the Malta national team.

Career
Born in Canada, Vella has dual nationality, Maltese and Canadian. His family moved to Malta in 1970. He started playing football with Rabat Ajax and when he was promoted to the senior team, he soon became an invaluable asset, and rarely missed a game.

Silvio Vella was chosen as Malta's Footballer of the Year in the 1993–94 season, in spite of Rabat Ajax' relegation as the first (and to date only) player from a relegated team to win that award. This was at the height of his career, and to keep on playing in the Premier Division he joined Hibernians. Although it was initially a loan deal, it became a permanent transfer later on, and he remained a Hibernians player for the rest of his career.

After his retirement in the summer of 2002, he joined the Malta Football Association's coaching staff for the various national teams. He served as assistant coach for the Maltese U21 national team until October 2009, when he became U19 national team coach. In June 2010 Vella joined his former club Rabat Ajax as their new manager. He became head coach of the U21 team in March 2014, and held that position until January 2021, when he was replaced by Gilbert Agius.

Club Management

On 7 February 2023, Hibernians announced that Silvio Vella will be the club's new coach, replacing Andrea Pisanu.

Achievements

Player 
Maltese Premier League: 3
 1985/86, 1994/95, 2001/02

Maltese Cup: 2 
 1985/86, 1997/98

MFA Super Cup: 3 
 1985, 1986, 1994

 Maltese Player of the Year : 1
 1993/94

References

External links
 
 Biography-Times Of Malta
 Silvio Vella Appointed New Rabat Ajax Coach

Living people
1967 births
Soccer players from Toronto
People with acquired Maltese citizenship
Maltese footballers
Rabat Ajax F.C. players
Hibernians F.C. players
Maltese football managers
Rabat Ajax F.C. managers
Association football defenders
Malta international footballers